Trephionus shibataianus, is a species of beetle belonging to the family Carabidae. It is endemic to Japan.

Description
Body length of male is about 8.4 mm. Head and pronotum black. Elytra blackish brown to black. Endophallus stout. No hind wings. Dorso-apical lobe narrowed apically. Apex of aedeagus truncate.

References

Beetles described in 1878
Platyninae